Raphael Nguyễn Văn Diệp  (20 October 1926 – 20 December 2007) was a Vietnamese bishop of the Roman Catholic Churchin Vietnam.

Biography
Raphael Diệp was born in Long Thôi in 1926. He was ordained a priest on 7 December 1954.

He was appointed titular bishop of  Tubusuptu and coadjutor bishop of Vĩnh Long by Pope Paul VI. The appointment of a coadjutor bishop was due to the then difficult and unstable political situation in Vietnam.
He received his episcopal consecration from bishop Jacques Nguyễn Văn Mầu, on the same day of his appointment 15 August  1975.
Despite initial fears, he never took over the government of the diocese. He continued serving the community as coadjutor bishop until 27 May 2000, when he retired due to reaching the age limit.
He died on 20 December 2007, aged 81.

See also

References

External links
Catholic Hierarchy: Bishop Raphaël Nguyễn Văn Diệp 

20th-century Roman Catholic bishops in Vietnam
1926 births
2007 deaths
People from Bến Tre Province